SBMC may refer to:

 Saint Barnabas Medical Center , a non-profit major teaching hospital located in Livingston, New Jersey.
 Sher-e-Bangla Medical College , a public medical college located in Barisal , a city in Bangladesh